Laura Siegemund was the defending champion, but lost in the second round to CoCo Vandeweghe.

Karolína Plíšková won the title, defeating Vandeweghe in the final, 7–6(7–2), 6–4.

15-year-old Marta Kostyuk became the youngest player to win a main draw match in Stuttgart since Martina Hingis in October 1994.

Seeds
The top four seeds received a bye into the second round.

Draw

Finals

Top half

Bottom half

Qualifying

Seeds

Qualifiers

Lucky loser

Draw

First qualifier

Second qualifier

Third qualifier

Fourth qualifier

References

External links
 Main draw
 Qualifying draw

Porsche Tennis Grand Prix Singles
2018 Women's Singles